Dheem Tharikida Thom is a 1986 Indian Malayalam-language comedy film directed by Priyadarshan. This film is about an innocent young man joining a ballet team just to express his love towards the main actress. Maniyan Pillai Raju and Lizy appears in the leading roles, supported by Mukesh, Nedumudi Venu, Sreenivasan, Jagathi Sreekumar and Shankar.  The story is adapted from the British musical comedy film Happy Go Lovely.

Plot

Siva Subrahmaniam aka Subru, an innocent bank employee is in love with Rohini, but is afraid to express his love to her. His grandmother wants him to be a Brahmachari and become a priest at the nearby temple. Rohini is working as an artist at the Keerikkad ballet troupe run by Keerikkad Chellappan Nair.

Subru joins the ballet troupe to woo Rohin after taking the advice of Sankaran Pillai, Chellappan Nair's assistant. She is attracted to his innocent and straightforward behavior and falls in love with him. One day when she misses her bus, Rohini asks a car driver for a lift, and she is dropped at the ballet troupe office without any knowledge that the car belongs to Suresh Menon, a rich business tycoon in the area. Sankaran and Chellappan mistake her to be in love with Suresh Menon.

In order to appease Suresh Menon and get him to invest in the troupe, Chellappan offers the lead role to Rohini and gives her a pay raise. Meanwhile, Subrahmaniam is suspended from the bank for not attending office for a long time. Due to certain misunderstandings, Rohini breaks up with him, hurting him deeply. Subru is also thrown out of the troupe by Chellappan Nair for not performing up to the mark.

Suresh Menon, upon knowing about Rohini and her claims of being his love interest, appears in front of her. Not knowing that he is the original Suresh Menon, she takes his help in solving the mess created at the ballet troupe. In the end, Suresh Menon solves the mess and gets Subru and Rohini together once again.

Cast
Maniyanpilla Raju as Siva Subrahmaniam
Lissy as Rohini
Nedumudi Venu as Keerikkad Chellappan Nair
Shankar as Suresh Menon
Jagathy Sreekumar as Sankaran Pillai
Mukesh as Raghavan
Sreenivasan as Bhaskaran
Kuthiravattam Pappu as Kareem
Innocent as Kurian
Menaka
Kamala Kamesh
Poojappura Ravi as SI Santhosh
Paravoor Bharathan 
Manavalan Joseph
Valsala Menon as Rohini's mother
Bobby Kottarakkara
Kothuku Nanappan

Soundtrack
The music was composed by M. G. Radhakrishnan and Nedumudi Venu and the lyrics were written by Nedumudi Venu and S. Ramesan Nair.

References

External links
 

1980s Malayalam-language films
Films directed by Priyadarshan